Kaukausib-River in German called Kaukausib-Mulde is a rivier (dry river) within the Diamond Restricted Area also called Sperrgebiet in the south of Namibia. The Kaukausib-Rivier extends through the Namib from south to north-north-west. It ends in the Namib Desert without reaching the Atlantic, or any other river. At the upper end of the Kaukausib Rivier there is a spring, which carries water throughout the whole year and is a drinking trough for various animals, especially for Oryx and Ostrich. The Kaukausib-spring is located 62 km southeast of Lüderitz and 40 km east of the Atlantic coast on 375 m above sea level (1235 ft). 

In early days, on the march from Lüderitzbucht to Aus oxen were watered at the Kaukausib-well. The Germans write: 

In English it means:

The book Diamonds in the Desert describes, how August Stauch established a company in the beginning of the 20th century called Kaukausibtal Diamantengesellschaft.

Pictures 
Pictures of Kaukausib

References 

Rivers of Namibia
Geography of ǁKaras Region